L'insegnante balla... con tutta la classe (literally The schoolteacher dances ... with the whole class) is a 1979 commedia sexy all'italiana directed by Giuliano Carnimeo. The film is the first in the "Schoolteacher" film series which does not star Edwige Fenech in the main role. It is considered the breakout title for Nadia Cassini.

Plot
Italy, late 1970s. In a high school, the gym teacher Claudia Gambetti (Nadia Cassini), wreaks havoc with its attractiveness and its particular teaching method, based on dance.

Cast 
Lino Banfi: Professor Mezzoponte
Nadia Cassini: Claudia Gambetti 
Alvaro Vitali: Anacleto
Renzo Montagnani: Professor Martorelli
Mario Carotenuto: Principal
Francesca Romana Coluzzi: Russian coach
Stefano Amato: Adamo Adami

References

External links

L'insegnante balla... con tutta la classe at Variety Distribution

1979 films
Commedia sexy all'italiana
Italian high school films
Insegnante films
Films directed by Giuliano Carnimeo
Films set in Tuscany
1970s sex comedy films
1979 comedy films
1970s Italian films